Modern Life is a 2000 French drama film directed by Laurence Ferreira Barbosa and starring Isabelle Huppert.

Cast
 Isabelle Huppert - Claire
 Frédéric Pierrot - Jacques
 Lolita Chammah - Marguerite
 Juliette Andréa - Eva
 Jean-Pierre Gos - Marguerite's father
 Robert Kramer - Andy Hellman
 Aurélien Recoing - Georges
 Marc Rioufol - Leon
 Teo Saavedra - Herminio
 Jérémie Korenfeld - Pierre François
 Jacques Spiesser - Désormières
 Blandine Paulet - Sandra
 Jean-Baptiste Montagut - Handsome neighbor
 Cécile Richard - Gertrude
 Nathalie Nell - Annick Renard
 Philippe Rebbot - Threatening man

See also
 Isabelle Huppert on screen and stage

References

External links

2000 films
2000 drama films
French drama films
2000s French-language films
Films directed by Laurence Ferreira Barbosa
Films produced by Paulo Branco
2000s French films